Izzat Artykov (born 8 September 1993) is a Kyrgyz  weightlifter. He is the 2016 Asian champion.

Career
He competed in the men's 69 kg event at the 2016 Asian Weightlifting Championships where he won a gold medal. At the 2016 Summer Olympics he won the bronze medal in the 69 kg category. He was later disqualified after failing a doping test. His bronze medal was withdrawn and awarded instead to the fourth-placed lifter, Luis Javier Mosquera.

Major results

See also 
 Kyrgyzstan at the 2016 Summer Olympics

References

External links
 
 
 

1993 births
Living people
Kyrgyzstani male weightlifters
Weightlifters at the 2014 Asian Games
Weightlifters at the 2018 Asian Games
Asian Games medalists in weightlifting
Asian Games bronze medalists for Kyrgyzstan
Medalists at the 2018 Asian Games
Weightlifters at the 2016 Summer Olympics
Olympic weightlifters of Kyrgyzstan
Competitors stripped of Summer Olympics medals
Doping cases in weightlifting
Kyrgyzstani sportspeople in doping cases
21st-century Kyrgyzstani people